describes the structure and development of classic Chinese, Korean and Japanese narratives. The structure originated in China and was called qǐ chéng zhuǎn hé and used in Chinese poetry as a four-line composition, such as Qijue. From there, it moved to Korea where it is called gi seung jeon gyeol (Hangul: 기승전결; Hanja: 起承轉結).

Regional variations
There are variations of this dramatic structure based on region due to differences in how the Chinese characters are interpreted per the country and culture.

Chinese
 : start or introduction, usually meaning the reason a thing begins
 : meant handling, process, or hardships
 : turn, turning point, crescendo
 : result.

Korean
 기 : raising issues and introducing characters
 승 : the beginning of the action (but not to solve a problem, necessarily, but usually for self-realization)
 전 : a reversal or change in direction 
 결 : the matter is concluded and any lessons are gained through the process or results

Japanese

    is '': introduction, where 起 can mean rouse, wake up, get up 
    is '': development, where 承 can also mean acquiesce, hear, listen to, be informed, receive 
  is '': twist, where 転 can mean revolve, turn around, change 
  is '': conclusion, though 結 can also mean result, consequence, outcome, effect, coming to fruition, bearing fruit, etc.

In a story, the following might happen: 
 : an introduction to the characters, era, and other information required to understand the plot.
 : follows leads towards the twist in the story. No major changes so far.  
 : the story turns toward an unexpected development. If the narrative takes several turns, this is the biggest one. 
 , also called  or ending, wraps up the story.

The same pattern is used for arguments. For example, a discussion about the usage of photocopying machines could be analyzed as follows:
 : Once, it was mandatory to copy information by hand. Mistakes were made that way.
 : The invention of copying machines made it possible to make copies more quickly and accurately. 
 : In a similar way, cars facilitate saving time when traveling, with the drawback of not being able to take in the local beauty. On the other hand, walking makes it easier to appreciate nature.
 : Although photocopying is easier, copying by hand can sometimes be better when it aids in retaining the information to use it later.

This structure can be used in yonkoma manga, and even for documents, dissertations, and music. Kishōtenketsu can apply to sentences, and even clauses, to chapter as well.

The concept has also been used in game design, particularly in Nintendo's video games, most notably Super Mario games such as Super Mario Galaxy (2007) and Super Mario 3D World (2013); their designers Shigeru Miyamoto and Koichi Hayashida are known to utilize this concept for their game designs.

See also
Dramatic structure
Contrastive rhetoric
Cross-cultural communication
Jo-ha-kyū, contrasting 3-part structure
Writing
Yonkoma

References

Poetic forms
Narratology
Japanese literary terminology